Hendrica Wilhelmina Petronella Maria Agatha "Herna" Verhagen (born 1966) is a Dutch business executive and the CEO of PostNL since 2012. Verhagen is one of two women leading publicly-listed companies in the Netherlands. 

In 2020, Verhagen was appointed by NATO Secretary General Jens Stoltenberg to join a group of experts to support his work in a reflection process to further strengthen NATO's political dimension.

Verhagen has a master's degree in Law from Nijmegen University, and a master's degree in Human Resources from Tilburg University.

References

1966 births
Dutch businesspeople
Dutch chief executives
Living people